Hélène Seuzaret born on 12 July 1976 in Tassin-la-Demi-Lune is a French actress.

Career
She began by performing classical repertoire (Le malade imaginaire, Les caprices de Marianne) and contemporary plays.

She played with Gérard Lanvin, Gérard Darmon and Jacques Villeret in the crime comedy "", then played the curator in the medium-length film  .

The following year, the actress reunited with her partner in Les héritières. She played a deported Jewish woman in "Un village français".
She then played in the spy series "No Limit", in Richelieu, la pourpre et le sang, in The Big Everything and, in 2016, in season 4 of Caïn.

She then played in series such as Meurtres en pays d'Oléron,  (with Helena Noguerra) and Le Pont des Oubliés.
She then played the role of the police lieutenant in the police comedy , with Claudia Tagbo.

Filmography

Film

Television

Theatre

Awards
 Nominated for the Best Female Newcomer at the Molière Award 2002.

References

1976 births
Living people
20th-century French actresses
21st-century French actresses
French film actresses
French stage actresses
People from Rhône (department)